Magda macht das schon! is a German television series that premiered on January 5, 2017, on RTL Television.

Plot
The Polish geriatric nurse Magda, big heart and big mouth urgently needs a new job and a new place to stay. Unquestioningly, she intervenes in a family quarrel at the Holtkamps and offers receptionist Cornelia and elevator technician Tobias as a nurse of Cornelia's mother Waltraud, who has been injured...

See also
List of German television series

References

External links
 

2017 German television series debuts
German-language television shows
RTL (German TV channel) original programming